The UAAP Season 77 men's seniors division football tournament started on November 29, 2014 at the Moro Lorenzo Football Field at the Ateneo de Manila University in Quezon City, Metro Manila. Opening-day games were the men's teams of UP vs DLSU at 2 PM and Ateneo vs UE at 4 PM. The tournament venue will also be played at the FEU-Diliman Football Field also in Quezon City, Metro Manila.

Women's seniors division tournament started on the other hand started on November 30, 2014 with Ateneo vs UP at 2PM and DLSU vs UST at 4PM. On the other hand, the Boys' juniors division will start on January 24, 2015 at the FEU-Diliman Football Field.

All divisions will have a double round robin elimination. In the Men's division top 4 teams will move on to the semifinals with both the semifinals and the finals in a Single knockout game.

Adamson University Falcons will be making its comeback in the Men's Seniors Division after more than a decade of absence. This marks the first year that all 8 member universities will compete in the Men's Seniors Football Division.

Men's tournament

Elimination round

Team standings

Match-up results

Scores
Results to the right and top of the gray cells are first round games, those to the left and below are second round games.

Bracket

Semifinals

Final

Statistics

Goal scorers 
16 goals

15 goals

12 goals

11 goals

9 goals

5 goals

4 goals

3 goals

2 goals

1 goal

own goal

Scoring 
As of February 15, 2014

Overall 
Total number of goals scored: 190
Average goals per match: 3.39
Total number of braces: 14
Jean Mari Clarino, Gerald Mark Layumas, Arnel Amita3, Gerardo Valmayor3, David Angelo Diamante, Paolo Salenga, Carlos Alberto Gerardo Monfort, Jesus Joaquin Melliza2, Efren Menares Jr., Steven Anotado, Lawrence Colina, Regil Kent Galaura
Most number of Braces: 3
Gerardo Valmayor, Arnel Amita
Total number of hat-tricks: 7
Eric Ben Giganto, Steven Anotado, Eric Ben Giganto42, Gerardo Valmayor, Arnel Amita
Most number of hat-tricks: 3
Eric Ben Giganto
Own goals scored: 2
Lord Irvin Jimena, Jin Daniel Montemayor

Timing 
First goal of the tournament: Gerardo Valmayor for UP Fighting Maroons against De La Salle Green Archers
First brace of the tournament: Jean Mari Clarino for UST Growling Tigers against FEU Tamaraws
First hat-trick of the tournament: Eric Ben Giganto for FEU Tamaraws against UST Growling Tigers
Fastest goal in a match from kickoff: 2nd minute
Gerald Mark Layumas for De La Salle Green Archers against Adamson Falcons
Fastest brace of the tournament: 9th minute
Jesus Joaquin Melliza for FEU Tamaraws against UE Red Warriors
Fastest hat-trick of the tournament: 47th minute
Steven Anotado for UST Growling Tigers against UE Red Warriors

Teams 
Most goals scored by a team: 52
FEU Tamaraws
Fewest goals scored by a team: 8
UE Red Warriors
Most goals conceded by a team: 47
Adamson Falcons
Fewest goals conceded by a team: 9
De La Salle Green Archers
Best goal difference: +35
FEU Tamaraws
Worst goal difference: -35
Adamson Falcons
Most goals scored in a match by both teams: 11
FEU Tamaraws 7-4 UST Growling Tigers
Most goals scored in a match by one team: 9
FEU Tamaraws
Most goals scored in a match by the losing team: 4
UST Growling Tigers
Biggest margin of victory: 8 goals 
FEU Tamaraws
Most clean sheets achieved by a team: 6
UP Fighting Maroons, De La Salle Green Archers
Fewest clean sheets achieved by a team: 0
Adamson Falcons
Most consecutive clean sheets achieved by a team: 3
FEU Tamaraws
Longest winning run: 4
De La Salle Green Archers, FEU Tamaraws
Longest unbeaten run: 14
De La Salle Green Archers
Longest winless run: 12
Adamson Falcons

Awards

Most Valuable Player: Jess Melliza (Far Eastern University)
Rookie of the Year: Julian Roxas (Ateneo de Manila University)
Best Striker: Jinggoy Valmayor (University of the Philippines)
Best Defender: Julian Clariño (University of the Philippines)
Best Midfielder: Nathan Alquiros (De La Salle University)
Best Goalkeeper: Raphael De Guzman (De La Salle University)
Fair Play Award: Adamson University

Women's tournament

Elimination round

Team standings

Match-up results

Scores
Results to the right and top of the gray cells are first round games, those to the left and below are second round games.

Final

Statistics

Goal Scorers 

3 goals

2 goals

1 goal

Own goal

Awards

Most Valuable Player: Alesa Dolino (Far Eastern University)
Rookie of the Year: Chelo Hodges (De La Salle University)
Best Striker:
Kathleen Camille Rodriguez (Ateneo de Manila University)
Cristina Delos Reyes (University of the Philippines)
Rose Obra (University of the Philippines)
Alesa Dolino (Far Eastern University)
Best Midfielder: Cristina Delos Reyes (University of the Philippines)
Best Defender: Alesa Dolino (Far Eastern University)
Best Goalkeeper: Inna Palacios (De La Salle University)
Fair Play Award: De La Salle University

Juniors' tournament

Elimination round

Team standings

Match-up results

Scores
Results to the right and top of the gray cells are first round games, those to the left and below are second round games.

Finals

Awards

Overall championship points

Seniors' division

Juniors' division

 

In case of a tie, the team with the higher position in any tournament is ranked higher. If both are still tied, they are listed by alphabetical order.

How rankings are determined:
 Ranks 5th to 8th determined by elimination round standings.
 Loser of the #1 vs #4 semifinal match-up is ranked 4th
 Loser of the #2 vs #3 semifinal match-up is ranked 3rd
 Loser of the finals is ranked 2nd
 Champion is ranked 1st

See also
 UAAP Season 77

References

2014 in Philippine football
2015 in Philippine football
77 football
UAAP Season 77